Shi'i extremists may refer to:

Adherents of modern Islamic extremism in its Shi'i variant
, early branch of Shi'i Islam (8th/9th century) perceived as holding 'extreme' views about the Imams

See also
Islamist Shi'ism, political form of Shi'i Islam (not necessarily extremist)